Kim Tae-kyung (Hangul: 김태경; born March 29, 1998) is a South Korean figure skater. She was selected to compete at the 2014 Four Continents Championships in Taipei. She placed 18th in the short program, 15th in the free skate, and 16th overall.

Programs

Competitive highlights

References

 2013 Taipei Open Results

External links
 

1998 births
Living people
South Korean female single skaters
Figure skaters from Seoul